Vechornytsi (from вечір "evening") are Ukrainian traditional gatherings with music, songs, jokes and rituals.
Vechornytsi traditionally began in late September after the seasonal agricultural work was over. Young people from villages gathered in the evenings for entertainment. There were everyday and festive vechornytsi. During everyday parties people created folk art objects like rushnyky, while entertaining themselves by singing songs or telling jokes. During festive vechornytsi rich dinners were cooked, and there was music and dancing. It was the ladies' responsibility to cook a dinner and the men's responsibility to provide everybody with music, drinks, and sweets.

Vechornytsi were mainly for younger people. Here they not only entertained each other during long winter evenings, but also met new people, communicated more closely, and found partners. Each street in a village had at least one house for vechornytsi. Even small remote farms could have a few houses for parties, because it was a custom that brothers and sisters could not attend the same vechornytsi.

References
 Definition of Vechornytsi

External links
 The Article on Ukrainian Holidays, Customs and Rituals 

Entertainment in Ukraine
Ukrainian culture